Deathgasm is a 2015 New Zealand independent comedy horror film written and directed by Jason Lei Howden in his directorial debut. The film premiered on 14 March 2015 at South by Southwest and was released in theaters later that year to positive reviews.

Plot 
After his father dies and his mother is institutionalized, teenager Brodie moves in with his Uncle Albert in Greypoint. Brodie is a metalhead, which conflicts with Uncle Albert's fundamentalist Christian beliefs. He is bullied at high school by other students, including his cousin David. Brodie's only friends are geeks Dion and Giles, but he later meets and befriends another metal fan, Zakk. The four decide to form a metal band, Deathgasm. To Brodie's surprise, the beautiful Medina appears to be interested in him and they go out on a date, but Brodie is too shy to kiss her.

Zakk convinces Brodie to venture into an abandoned house to find metal musician Rikki Daggers. They find him sleeping inside holding a record. After accidentally awakening him, he hands them the album and convinces them to flee. A man named Vadin later kills Daggers. Vadin is part of a cult which is looking for "The Black Hymn," medieval sheet music with the power to summon demons. Since Vadin failed to obtain The Black Hymn, the cult's leader, Aeon, has him beheaded.

Brodie finds the Black Hymn inside the record's cover, and Deathgasm plays the song, resulting in flickering lights and Uncle Albert hyperventilating and bleeding from his eyes, before Brodie stops after feeling that something is wrong. The next day in school, Brodie translates the Latin writing on the sheet, saying: "The black hymn. Play it to invoke the demon." Medina finds Zakk and passes him a note to give Brodie that contains a message to meet at the local park; Zakk keeps the note and lies to her that Brodie no longer wants to see her before they kiss.

Brodie deduces that the Black Hymn is connected to dark forces and, wanting to take revenge upon his bullies, completes playing the Black Hymn with Deathgasm. The band is knocked unconscious and notices that something is different upon awakening. Several townspeople begin vomiting blood. After Brodie meets up with Zakk to ponder about why Medina ignored him, the two are later attacked by Zakk's demonically possessed father, whom they manage to kill. Dion, Giles, and Medina also fend off the possessed and hide in the school's panic room and leave a note on Brodie's door regarding their location. Trying to find out what is happening, Zakk and Brodie meet with fortune teller Abigail, who tells them they have invoked the demon Aeloth by playing the hymn, and that the residents of town are now possessed by Aeloth's demons, which kill and possess every human being in order to prepare Aeloth's arrival. By 3 AM, Aeloth will merge with the most evil human being present. Before she is able to tell them how to undo Aeloth's summoning, she is killed by her possessed boyfriend Byron before becoming a demon herself.

The cult members arrive at Greypoint to herald Aeloth's arrival, but Aeon is killed by his acolyte Shanna, who usurps leadership. Zakk is not interested in fighting Aeloth, but Brodie manages to convince him to help under the assumption that summoning will be undone by playing the Black Hymn backwards. They drive to Brodie's house to obtain the sheets of music, however the wind blows it away while Zakk removes the note placed by Medina. After killing Uncle Albert and David, the two find the sheets while killing several of the possessed. Brodie and Zakk head to the school where they reunite with Dion, Giles, and Medina. However, Brodie finds Zakk's jacket in Medina's bag and confronts him over deceiving them; Zakk admits that he is not interested in Medina and wanted to do it out of boredom before deciding to abandon the group.

The remaining four head to Daggers' house to play the song with Daggers' loud amplifiers, but they are confronted by the cult, where Shanna takes the band prisoner and rips apart the sheets. A remorseful Zakk rescues his bandmates and Deathgasm disrupts the cult's ritual to summon Aeloth. Brodie begins to play the Black Hymn backwards, but Dion and Giles are killed by the demons. Brodie is unable to finish playing in time, and Aeloth enters the body of Shanna, who is quickly killed by Zakk. However, since he is the most evil person amongst them, Aeloth then takes possession of Zakk's body and attacks Brodie and Medina. Brodie realizes it is too late to complete the hymn, so instead he just passionately plays heavy metal. Brodie's playing causes Zakk to collapse and temporarily transform back into his human body, and Zakk convinces Brodie to kill him to prevent Aeloth's resurrection.

A few months later, Brodie and Medina are a happy death metal-loving couple in Greypoint. Zakk's spirit returns through one of Brodie's records and they converse over what hell is like.

Cast 
 Milo Cawthorne as Brodie
 James Blake as Zakk
 Kimberley Crossman as Medina 
 Sam Berkley as Dion
 Daniel Cresswell as Giles
 Delaney Tabron as Shanna
 Stephen Ure as Rikki Daggers
 Tim Foley as Vadin
 Kate Elliott as Abigail
 Nick Hoskins-Smith as David
 Colin Moy as Uncle Albert
 Jodie Rimmer as Aunt Mary
 Erroll Shand as Byron
 Andrew Laing as Aeon
 Aaron McGregor as Terry
 Cameron Rhodes as Mr. Cappenhurst
 Campbell Rousselle as Ron
 Paula Hallagher as Brodie's Mum

Production 
Howden took inspiration from his teenage years, in which he was a social outcast and fan of heavy metal music. The film won the 2013 Make My Horror Movie contest and received a NZ$200,000 prize to go toward production, which took place in mid-2014.  Executive producer Ant Timpson cited Howden's "sheer enthusiasm and utter commitment" as to why it won.

Reception 
Rotten Tomatoes reports that 87% of 30 critics gave the film a positive notice; the average rating is 6.75/10. The site's consensus states: "Deathgasm plumbs the blood-spattered depths of grindhouse gore with enough giddy glee to satisfy genre enthusiasts looking for a thrill." On Metacritic, the film has a 65 out of 100 rating, based on 10 critics, indicating "generally favorable reviews".Dennis Harvey of Variety wrote that the script does not live up the vivid splatter effects, but the film's "consistent if undiscriminating high energy engenders a certain persuasive goodwill". Richard Whittaker of The Austin Chronicle wrote, "Shamelessly low-brow, reaching a beer-fueled gleeful high with a zombie-vs.-sex toys battle, it's a very metal tribute to the grand tradition of Kiwi splatter comedies." Matt Donato of We Got This Covered rated it 4/5 stars and wrote, "Deathgasm is the ultimate midnight movie (for metalheads especially), hitting on notes of horror insanity that blend face-melting riffage with equally outstanding practical effects."At Bloody Disgusting, Brad Miska and Patrick Cooper reviewed the film, and both rated it four out of five stars. Miska called it "the most metal horror film ever", and Cooper said that it was "the movie the SXSW Midnighters category was created for". Drew Tinnin of Dread Central rated it 4/5 stars and wrote, "Deathgasm knows exactly what it is and where its heart is, giving genre fans a welcome return to heavy metal in horror without cutting back on any of the splatstick that New Zealand has become known for, for better or worse." Zach Gayne of Twitch Film wrote, "[T]he voice that shines through the hysterical dialogue and playfully comic editing, is so teenage, so punk, it makes a beat-to-death genre feel refreshing." Heather Wixson of Daily Dead rated it 5/5 stars and called it a "ridiculously fun and bombastic celebration of horror and heavy metal".In early 2016, Walmart refused to sell Deathgasm in its current form. Walmart renamed the film to a more 'acceptable' title "Heavy Metal Apocalypse."

Accolades 

Nominated for a Fangoria Chainsaw Award, Best Makeup FX/Creature Design

 Toronto After Dark Film Festival
 Best Feature Film – Anchor Bay Entertainment Audience Choice Award Winner: Gold
 Best Special Effects
 Best Music
 Best Title Sequence
 Best Trailer
 Best Film To Watch With A Crowd
 Best Kill (Death by Sex Toy)
 Best Gore
 Best Screening Q&A

 Knoxville Horror Film Festival
 Palm D'Gore
 Best Director: Jason Lei Howden

 Total Film Frightfest
 Best Gore for Dildos & chainsaws

 Festival de cine de Terror de Molins de Rei
 Best Feature Film
 Best Actor: Milo Cawthorne

 Razor Reel Flanders Film Festival
 Audience Award

 HARD LINE Film Festival, Germany
 Audience Award

 L'Absurde Séance Film Festival
 Audience Award

 Arizona Underground Film Festival
 Audience Award

Cancelled Sequel 
A sequel, titled Deathgasm Part 2: Goremageddon, was revealed on 16 December 2015 to be in production. On the topic of Goremaggedon Jason Lei Howden said that "There is literally more gore in the first 10 minutes than the entire first #deathgasm. If you kinda liked the first, this will make your head implode. If you thought the first Deathgasm was puerile, juvenile and dumb, then Goremageddon will melt your face off and force you to barricade yourself inside, safe with some Terrence Malick and Coldplay.” On January 31, 2021 Howden tweeted that the film was rejected by the New Zealand Film Commission board so the production would not go ahead.

References

Further reading

External links 
 
 
 

2015 films
2015 horror films
2015 comedy horror films
2015 independent films
New Zealand independent films
2010s English-language films
Demons in film
Films about musical groups
Films set in Auckland
Films shot in New Zealand
Heavy metal films
New Zealand slapstick films
New Zealand splatter films
New Zealand comedy horror films
2010s exploitation films
2015 directorial debut films
2015 comedy films
Zombie comedy films
New Zealand zombie films